Stereodmeta is a genus of moth in the family Gelechiidae. It contains the species Stereodmeta xylodeta, which is found in Brazil.

References

Gelechiinae
Gelechiidae of South America
Fauna of Brazil
Monotypic moth genera